The 2015 NCAA Division III Field Hockey Championship will be the 35th women's collegiate field hockey tournament organized by the NCAA to determine the top Division III college field hockey team n the United States. The semifinals and championship match will be played at the Turf Field at Washington and Lee University in Lexington, Virginia from November 21–22, 2015. W&L is hosting for the second consecutive year.

TCNJ are the defending national champions.

Qualified teams
 A total of 24 teams qualified for the 2015 tournament. 19 teams received automatic bids by winning their conference tournaments and an additional five teams earned at-large bids based on their regular season records.

Automatic qualifiers

At-large qualifiers

Bracket

See also 
NCAA Division I Field Hockey Championship
NCAA Division II Field Hockey Championship

References 

2015
2015 in American women's sports
2015 in women's field hockey
2015 in sports in Virginia